WPC/DC Sharon "Shaz" Granger is a fictional character in BBC One's science fiction/police procedural drama, Ashes to Ashes. The character is portrayed by Montserrat Lombard. The character's look and style are based on Joanne Catherall of The Human League in 1981.

Personality

The character of Sharon Granger is described as "friendly, eager and helpful" by the programme's official website. Granger joined Gene Hunt's (Philip Glenister) Criminal Investigation Department two years prior to the second series, acting as a uniformed aide with responsibility for administration.

During the first two series, Granger is shown to be unfulfilled with her current tasks within CID. Despite having been referred to as a "lobotomised Essex girl" by Gene Hunt, Granger has demonstrated a "keen intelligence and diverse knowledge" on literature, history and the arts.

She has a more progressive attitude than many of her colleagues, frequently challenging them on their various prejudices. She is also a supporter of the Labour party, and opposes Thatcher.

Following the arrival of protagonist Alex Drake (Keeley Hawes) in the series, the two become friends.

During episode two of the third series, Granger contemplates leaving the Metropolitan Police. However, after she goes on an undercover operation to catch a serial killer - during which she saves herself from an attempt on her life by stabbing her attacker with a screwdriver - and Hunt promises to allow her into CID by Christmas, she decides to stay. After she accepts Hunt's offer, there is a brief musical cue of 'Life On Mars' and a close up of a spaced out Granger. A voice can also be heard; this is later revealed by Chris, who has a similar experience, to be that of Nelson (Tony Marshall), the landlord of The Railway Arms from Life on Mars. This moment seems to symbolise the resolution of her internal conflict relating to her revelation in the finale, as on this occasion she is able to successfully defend herself.

Along with this, Shaz, Ray and Chris all have worrying visions of stars throughout the third season.

Stabbing

During episode 7 of the first series, Granger attempts to apprehend an armed and dangerous Gil Hollis, shortly after he fired upon the team while they were taking cover in Luigi's trattoria opposite Fenchurch East Police Station. After eventually nearing Hollis, Granger tackles him to the ground, the knife Hollis is holding penetrating her stomach as they fall. Once Alex Drake, Chris Skelton (Marshall Lancaster), Ray Carling (Dean Andrews), and Gene Hunt arrive at the scene, Drake carries out CPR on Granger. After Drake's attempts seem to have failed, Hunt orders Hollis to his knees and allows Skelton and Carling to violently assault him while he is in police custody, despite the protest of Viv James (Geff Francis). However, Drake manages to revive Granger and she is taken to hospital.

During episode 8, Granger recovers and joins the group again.

Finale

During the finale it is revealed that, in reality, Shaz is already dead. She was killed in 1995 (although in the original script of the finale she died on 19 April 1996). while attempting to apprehend a would-be car thief stealing a Ford Sierra. The thief stabbed her in the abdomen with a screwdriver, leaving her to bleed to death. The world she occupies during the series is a form of limbo.

After Alex persuades Gene to join the undercover operation that Chris, Shaz and Ray have organised, he radios through to Ray, Chris and Shaz just as DCI Jim Keats (Daniel Mays) is going to take them away. After persuading Ray and Chris to return to him, Gene radios Shaz and informs her that "Shaz, you are now promoted to Detective Constable, effective immediately". Granger is the first to return to Gene and Alex just before the sting.

She and Chris are reunited before crossing over into 'the pub', together with Ray and Alex. Before leaving, she gives Hunt a peck on the cheek, Hunt telling her "you keep [Chris] out of trouble, Detective Constable Granger".

Relationships

During the second series, Granger enters into a relationship with Chris Skelton and eventually they become engaged. During the first episode of the third series, it is revealed that Granger and Skelton are no longer together; however, they mend their relationship in the finale.

Granger is also close to Alex Drake, who tells the comatose Sharon that she is her "favourite imaginary construct", because she "is so alive". Granger expresses her admiration of Drake throughout the series, describing her as "the most amazing woman [she's] ever met".

Granger has a strained relationship with Ray Carling, whose sexism means he often mocks her and doesn't take her seriously. They also clash on many political issues, such as Carling's support of Thatcher and his dismissal of opposition to apartheid, leading her to call him "intolerant", "prejudiced", and "racist". During episode two of the second series, Granger reveals that her mother is Romani, after hearing Carling making antiziganistic remarks. Their relationship improves over the course of the third season, with Carling telling Granger that he is "very proud to be a colleague of [hers]" in the second episode. In the fifth episode of the third season, the two sing a duet of 'Danny Boy' on stage together. Ray also confides in Shaz about his visions of stars, and she comforts him when they later share these visions.

Granger admires DCI Hunt, calling him "brave as a lion", however, in the third season, she becomes frustrated with his harsh treatment of her and her colleagues, especially Chris, and with his inability to keep his promise of promoting her to CID. She overcomes this in the finale by obeying his orders to leave Keats and join the undercover operation.

References

External links
 Sharon Granger (Ashes to Ashes)

Ashes to Ashes (TV series) characters
Fictional British police officers
Television characters introduced in 2008
Fictional Romani people